Bayano Kamani (born 17 April 1980 in Houston, Texas) is a Panamanian hurdler who specialises in the 400 metres hurdles. He is the South American record holder in that event. He competed in the 2004 Olympic Games placing 5th in the finals. In 2005 he ran the 2nd fastest time in the world of 47.84. He competed at the 2008 Summer Olympics in Beijing, reaching the semi-finals.

Previously competed for Westbury High School of Houston, TX and Baylor University where he was inducted to the Athletics Hall of Fame in 2015. He was the 1999 and 2001 NCAA Champion in the 400 hurdles.  He was also a part of two of Baylor's victorious 4x400 meters relay teams.

International competitions

References

External links 

1980 births
Living people
Track and field athletes from Houston
Panamanian male hurdlers
American male hurdlers
Olympic athletes of Panama
Athletes (track and field) at the 2004 Summer Olympics
Athletes (track and field) at the 2008 Summer Olympics
Pan American Games medalists in athletics (track and field)
Athletes (track and field) at the 2007 Pan American Games
Pan American Games silver medalists for Panama
Universiade medalists in athletics (track and field)
World Athletics Championships athletes for Panama
Central American and Caribbean Games gold medalists for Panama
Competitors at the 2006 Central American and Caribbean Games
Universiade silver medalists for the United States
Central American and Caribbean Games medalists in athletics
Medalists at the 1999 Summer Universiade
Medalists at the 2007 Pan American Games